Promenesta autampyx is a moth in the family Depressariidae. It was described by Edward Meyrick in 1925. It is found in Peru, Paraguay and Brazil.

References

Moths described in 1925
Promenesta
Taxa named by Edward Meyrick